Ututu Punta (Quechua ututu a small viper, punta peak; ridge, 'viper peak (or ridge)", also spelled Otuto Punta) is a mountain in the Andes of Peru which reaches a height of approximately . It is located in the Ancash Region, Huari Province, Paucas District. It lies north of Kunkush.

References

Mountains of Peru
Mountains of Ancash Region